Panzer VI can refer to three different German tanks: 

Krupp PzKpfw NbFz VI, one of the Neubaufahrzeug prototype tanks
Panzer VIE, or Tiger I
Panzer VIB, or Tiger II